Masani is a village on Sahibi River barrage in Rewari District in the Indian state of Haryana. it is location of lake, eco-tourism, farm tourism and industrial units. It is situated on Rewari-Dharuhera road section of national highway NH 919 (former name NH 71B) that connects Rewari to Sohna and Palwal.

Transport 
National highway NH 919 (former name NH 71B) merges with national highway NH 48 (former name NH 8) (Delhi-Jaipur-Mumbai) at this barrage. Union govt announced the plan to four-lane the Masani barrage road.

Sahabi barrage 
Sahabi barrage on Sahibi River is named after this village. Government of Haryana is coordinating with Government of Rajasthan to ensure water reaches usually-dry masani barrage and dying seasonal Sahibi river. Another project is being implemented to channel the extra water of Yamuna river during monsoon to Masani barrage through Jawahar Lal Nehru Canal and Western Yamuna Canal.

Rajiv Gandhi Herbal Park and Nature Camp, Sahabi  Barrage 
Rajiv Gandhi Herbal Park and Nature Camp, Sahabi  Barrage was set up in 2011 by Government of Haryana at Sahabi  Barrage to promote eco-tourism. It includes a herbal conservation park, ayurveda center, wetlands and children park set up by the Forests Department, Haryana. It also has log huts accommodation, tree houses, nature trails and dining facilities run by the Haryana Tourism. Haryana Forest Development Corporation (HFDC) plans to build an adventure tourism centre, with a one km long ropeway, on 45 acres of land at Sahabi  Barrage.

Masani Industrial Area 
Masani Industrial Area has several factories are located around Masani.

Adjacent Villages
 Nikhri* on Delhi-Jaipur Highway no 48 (NH8)
 On Rewari-Delhi road
 Dungarwas
 Jaunawas, not to be confused with similarly named Jauniawas village on Delhi-Jaipur Highway.
 Hansaka
 Khaliawas
 Nikhri on Delhi-Jaipur Highway no 48 (NH8)

See also 
 Masani Amman
 Najafgarh drain
 Hathni Kund Barrage
 Okhla Sanctuary and Okhla barrage
 Sultanpur National Park
 Wazirabad barrage
 ITO barrage
 Palla barrage

References

Villages in Rewari district
Tourism in Haryana